Ágnes Lehóczky is a Hungarian poet, academic and translator born in Budapest, 1976.

Biography
She completed her Masters in English and Hungarian Literature at Pázmány Péter Catholic University of Hungary in 2001 and an MA with distinction in Creative Writing at the University of East Anglia in 2006. She holds a PhD in Critical and Creative Writing, also from the UEA which she obtained in July 2011. Lehóczky is Senior Lecturer in Creative Writing at the University of Sheffield and Co-Director of the Centre for Poetry and Poetics, Sheffield and Contributing Advisor to Blackbox Manifold literary journal.

Lehóczky has published four poetry collections and several pamphlets in English, co-edited three major international poetry anthologies in the UK and is the author of an academic monograph on the poetry of Ágnes Nemes Nagy. She has also three full poetry collections in Hungarian published in Budapest, Hungary. Lehóczky has collaborated in various art projects with writers, photographers, composers, musicians, theatre performers, publishers, academics and translators; such as, among others, with Denise Riley, Adam Piette, Terry O’Connor, Nathan Hamilton, J.T. Welsch, Zoë Skoulding, Elzbieta Wójcik-Leese, Jenny Hval, George Szirtes, Andrew McDonnell, Sian Croose, Jonathan Baker, Henriette Louwerse, Harriet Tarlo, Honor Gavin, Astrid Alben, Amanda Crawley Jackson, Katharine Kilalea & S.J. Fowler; in collaboration with Writers’ Centre Norwich & The Voice Project her libretto was commissioned for Proportions of the Temple and performed in 2011; and in partnership with Citybooks, The University of Sheffield and deBuren in Brussels her Parasite of Town, a prose poem sequence on Sheffield, was published and also translated into Dutch and French in 2011. Lehóczky’s poetry has been widely anthologized in the UK and Hungary and appeared, among others, in The World Record (Bloodaxe, 2012), Dear World & Everyone in It: New Poetry in the UK (Bloodaxe, 2013), Atlantis (Spirit Duplicator, 2016), The Penguin Book of the Prose Poem; From Baudelaire to Anne Carson (Penguin, 2018), A századelő irodalma (a three-volumed anthology of Hungarian contemporary literature, ed. Gábor Zsille, Magyar Napló, Budapest, 2017), The Valley Press Anthology of Prose Poetry (forthcoming; eds. Anne Caldwell & Oz Hardwick, Valley Press, 2019) and Archive of the Now (ed. Andrea Brady). Her work has been translated into Polish (Elzbieta Wójcik-Leese), Bulgarian (by Nikolai Boikov), French (by Jean Portante & Michel Perquy) and Dutch (by Hans Kloos). Lehóczky’s various poems appeared in print and online in the UK, US and Europe: in, among others, English (Oxford Journals), Datableed, PN Review, The Wolf, Blackbox Manifold, Molly Bloom, Confluences Poetiques, Poetry Wales, Para-text, 3:AM Magazine, Kluger Hans, Long Poem Magazine, но поезия /No Poesia, Locomotive Journal, Make It New, Arterie, The Ofi Press, Magyar Napló, Kortárs, Free Verse and Chicago Review.

Publications

Books/ full poetry collections and recent editorial work  
 Swimming Pool (Shearsman Books, 2017)
 Pool Epitaphs and Other Love Letters (Boiler House Press, 2017)
 Carillonneur (Shearsman Books, 2014)
 Rememberer (Egg Box Publishing, 2012) 
 Budapest to Babel (Egg Box Publishing, 2008)

Pamphlets  
 Pool Epitaphs and Other Love Letters (Boiler House Press, 2017)
 Poems from the Swimming Pool (Constitutional Information, December, 2015)

Poetry collections in Hungarian  
 Palimpszeszt (Magyar Napló, Budapest, 2015)
 Medalion (Universitas, Budapest, 2002)
 Ikszedik stáció (Universitas, Budapest, 2000)

Academic / monograph   
 Poetry, the Geometry of Living Substance: Four Essays on the Poetry of Ágnes Nemes Nagy (Cambridge Scholars, 2011)

Recent editorial
 The World Speaking Back to Denise Riley (Boiler House Press, 2018) eds. Ágnes Lehóczky and Zoë Skoulding
 Wretched Strangers (Boiler House Press, 2018) eds. Ágnes Lehóczky and J. T. Welsch 
 The Sheffield Anthology, Poems from the City Imagined, eds. Ágnes Lehóczky, Adam Piette, Ann Sansom, Peter Sansom (Smith/Doorstop, 2012)

Articles, editorial introductions  
 ‘Endnotes on Disobedient Poetries, Paper Citizens, and Other Agoras,’in Wretched Strangers (Boiler House Press, 2018) eds. Ágnes Lehóczky and J. T. Welsch, (pp 311-322)
 ‘In Defence of Paradoxes: A Preface’, in The World Speaking Back to Denise Riley (Boiler House Press, 2018), eds. Ágnes Lehóczky and Zoë Skoulding, (pp xi-xvii)
 ‘Scribbling In That Other Tongue,’ (essay with 3 poems) in Poetry Wales, April, 2012 (pp31–33)
 ‘Conducting Cacophony,’ in In Their Own Words - Contemporary Poets on Their Poetry, eds. Helen Ivory and George Szirtes (Salt, 2012) (pp45–51)

Translation
 I Killed my Mother - András Visky’s play translated with Ailisha O'Sullivan (for the Rosemary Branch Theatre Performance, produced by Summer Dialogues Productions and presented in partnership with the Hungarian Cultural Centre and the Romanian Cultural Institute, London, March, 2013)
 New Order: Hungarian Poets of the Post 1989 Generation, ed. George Szirtes (Arc Publications, 2010)
 Poems by Kemény István and Virág Erdős. (Hungarian Quarterly, April, 2010)
 Poems and essays by Ágnes Nemes Nagy, Zsuzsa Takács, György Somlyó, Imre Kőrizs and Ákos Győrffy in Hungarian Literature Online: poems (www.hlo.hu) 2009
 Poems by Lavinia Greenlaw. (Nagyvilág, 2008, Hungary)

Radio
 BBC The Forum – a World of Ideas, with Guy Deutscher and Claude M. Steele – End of June, 2010: https://www.bbc.co.uk/programmes/p008762s

Honours and poetry awards  
 The Jane Martin National Poetry Prize of Girton College, Cambridge, 2011
 The Arthur Welton Award of the Authors’ Foundation/Society of Authors in support of my second collection of poems in English
 Representative Poet of Hungary: Poetry Parnassus, Southbank Centre, London, 2012
 Bertha Bulcsu-Award (August 2012, Budapest)

References

External links 
 Voice Project libretto
 Monograph on Nemes Nagy
 City Books project
 Interview with SJ Fowler
 University of Sheffield page
 Shearsman Books page
 

1976 births
Living people
Alumni of the University of East Anglia
Academics of the University of Sheffield
Writers from Budapest
Hungarian women poets
20th-century Hungarian poets
21st-century Hungarian poets
20th-century Hungarian women writers
21st-century Hungarian women writers